Cyclophorus is a genus of operculate land snails, terrestrial gastropod mollusks in the family Cyclophoridae.

Species 
Species in the genus Cyclophorus include:
 
 Cyclophorus aborensis Godwin-Austen, 1915
 Cyclophorus acutimarginatus (G. B. Sowerby I, 1842)
 Cyclophorus aetarum Möllendorff, 1895
 Cyclophorus affinis Theobald, 1858
 Cyclophorus alabastrinus (L. Pfeiffer, 1854)
 Cyclophorus alabatensis Kobelt, 1886
 Cyclophorus altivagus Benson, 1854
 Cyclophorus amoenus L. Pfeiffer, 1852
 Cyclophorus appendiculatus L. Pfeiffer, 1852
 Cyclophorus aquilus (G. B. Sowerby I, 1843)
 Cyclophorus arthriticus Theobald, 1864
 Cyclophorus ateribalteiformis D.-N. Chen & G.-Q. Zhang, 1998
 Cyclophorus atramentarium (G. B. Sowerby I, 1843)
 Cyclophorus aurantiacus (Schumacher, 1817)
 Cyclophorus aurora (Benson, 1851)
 Cyclophorus austenianus Preston, 1914
 Cyclophorus balteatus Benson, 1857
 Cyclophorus bankanus Martens, 1867
 Cyclophorus bapuensis Godwin-Austen, 1915
 Cyclophorus barandae Hidalgo, 1887
 Cyclophorus batanicus Quadras & Möllendorff, 1894
 Cyclophorus beddomeanus Preston, 1914
 Cyclophorus benguetensis Hidalgo, 1888
 Cyclophorus bensoni L. Pfeiffer, 1852
 Cyclophorus bustoi Hidalgo, 1888
 Cyclophorus cambodgensis Morlet, 1885
 Cyclophorus canaliferus (G. B. Sowerby I, 1842)
 Cyclophorus cantori (Benson, 1851)
 Cyclophorus caothaii Thach & F. Huber, 2020
 Cyclophorus ceratodes Möllendorff, 1895
 Cyclophorus ceylanicus L. Pfeiffer, 1852
 Cyclophorus charpentieri (Mousson, 1849)
 Cyclophorus cicatricosus Gredler, 1894
 Cyclophorus clouthianus Möllendorff, 1882
 Cyclophorus cochranei Godwin-Austen, 1889
 Cyclophorus consociatus E. A. Smith, 1893
 Cyclophorus cornutus Kobelt, 1902
 Cyclophorus coronensis Möllendorff, 1895
 Cyclophorus courbeti Ancey, 1888
 Cyclophorus crassalabella Godwin-Austen, 1888
 Cyclophorus crocatus (Born, 1778)
 Cyclophorus cruentus E. von Martens, 1865
 Cyclophorus cryptomphalus Benson, 1857
 Cyclophorus cucphuongensis Oheimb, 2019
 Cyclophorus cucullatus (A. Gould, 1856)
 Cyclophorus cybeus (Benson, 1857)
 Cyclophorus daraganicus Hidalgo, 1888
 Cyclophorus delavayanus Heude, 1885
 Cyclophorus denselineatus L. Pfeiffer, 1852
 Cyclophorus dilatatus Heude, 1886
 Cyclophorus diplochilus Möllendorff, 1894
 Cyclophorus dodrans Mabille, 1887
 Cyclophorus donghoiensis Thach & F. Huber, 2017
 Cyclophorus dubius (Morelet, 1881)
 Cyclophorus ectopoma Möllendorff, 1896
 Cyclophorus elegans Moellendorff, 1881
 Cyclophorus eudeli E. A. Smith, 1893
 Cyclophorus everetti E. A. Smith, 1893
 Cyclophorus exaltatus (L. Pfeiffer, 1855)
 Cyclophorus excellens L. Pfeiffer, 1854
 Cyclophorus expansus L. Pfeiffer, 1852
 Cyclophorus exul W. H. Benson, 1854
 Cyclophorus fargesianus Heude, 1885
 Cyclophorus fernandezi Hidalgo, 1888
 Cyclophorus ferruginosus Heude, 1885
 Cyclophorus flavilabris Benson, 1860
 Cyclophorus floridus (L. Pfeiffer, 1855)
 Cyclophorus formosaensis Nevill, 1881
 Cyclophorus franzhuberi Thach, 2017
 Cyclophorus friesianus Möllendorff, 1883
 Cyclophorus frinianus Heude, 1885
 Cyclophorus fruhstorferi Möllendorff, 1901
 Cyclophorus fulguratus (L. Pfeiffer, 1852)
 Cyclophorus fultoni Godwin-Austen & Beddome, 1894
 Cyclophorus fuscicolor Godwin-Austen, 1876
 Cyclophorus granum Morelet, 1881
 † Cyclophorus hangmonensis Raheem & Schneider in Raheem et al., 2017 
 Cyclophorus haughtoni Theobald, 1858
 Cyclophorus hebereri B. Rensch, 1933
 Cyclophorus hejingi Thach & F. Huber, 2020
 Cyclophorus herklotsi Martens, 1860
 Cyclophorus himalayanus L. Pfeiffer, 1852
 Cyclophorus hirasei Pilsbry, 1901
 Cyclophorus horridulum (Morelet, 1882) (extinct)
 Cyclophorus huberi Thach, 2016
 Cyclophorus hunganhi Thach & F. Huber, 2020
 Cyclophorus ibyatensis L. Pfeiffer, 1852
 Cyclophorus ignilabris Möllendorff, 1901
 Cyclophorus implicatus Bavay & Dautzenberg, 1909
 Cyclophorus indicus (Deshayes, 1834)
 Cyclophorus involvulus (O.F. Müller, 1774)
 Cyclophorus jerdoni (Benson, 1851)
 Cyclophorus johnabbasi Thach, 2020
 Cyclophorus jourdyi Morlet, 1886
 Cyclophorus khasiensis Nevill, 1850
 Cyclophorus khongensis Thach & F. Huber, 2017
 Cyclophorus kibleri Fulton, 1907
 Cyclophorus kikaiensis Pilsbry, 1902
 Cyclophorus kinabaluensis E. A. Smith, 1895
 Cyclophorus klobukowskii Morlet, 1885: synonym of Lagocheilus klobukowskii (Morlet, 1885) (original combination)
 Cyclophorus koboensis Godwin-Austen, 1915
 Cyclophorus labiosus (L. Pfeiffer, 1854)
 Cyclophorus leai (Tryon, 1869)
 Cyclophorus leucostomus (L. Pfeiffer, 1852)
 Cyclophorus linguiferus (G. B. Sowerby I, 1843)
 Cyclophorus lingulatus (G. B. Sowerby I, 1843)
 Cyclophorus loloensis Heude, 1890
 Cyclophorus luridus (L. Pfeiffer, 1852)
 Cyclophorus malayanus (Benson, 1852)
 Cyclophorus mansuyi Dautzenberg & H. Fischer, 1908
 Cyclophorus martensianus Möllendorff, 1874
 Cyclophorus massiei Morlet, 1891
 Cyclophorus menkeanus (Philippi, 1847)
 Cyclophorus microscopicus Morelet, 1881
 Cyclophorus moellendorffi Schmacker & O. Boettger, 1891
 Cyclophorus monachus (Morelet, 1866)
 Cyclophorus muspratti Godwin-Austen & Beddome, 1894
 Cyclophorus nagaensis Godwin-Austen & Beddome, 1894
 Cyclophorus ngankingensis Heude, 1882
 Cyclophorus ngheanensis Thach & F. Huber, 2018
 Cyclophorus niahensis Godwin-Austen, 1889
 Cyclophorus nicobaricus L. Pfeiffer, 1865
 Cyclophorus nigricans (L. Pfeiffer, 1861)
 Cyclophorus nilagiricus (Benson, 1852)
 Cyclophorus occultus Nantarat & Panha, 2019
 Cyclophorus ophis Hanley, 1875
 Cyclophorus orthostylus Möllendorff, 1898
 Cyclophorus palawanensis (E. A. Smith, 1893)
 Cyclophorus paracucphuongensis Oheimb, 2019
 Cyclophorus patens W. T. Blanford, 1862
 Cyclophorus paviei Morlet, 1885
 Cyclophorus pealianus Nevill, 1877
 Cyclophorus pearsoni (Benson, 1851)
 Cyclophorus perdix Broderip and Sowerby, 1829
 Cyclophorus philippinarum (G. B. Sowerby I, 1842)
 Cyclophorus phlegethon Godwin-Austen, 1889
 Cyclophorus phongnhakebangensis Oheimb, 2019
 Cyclophorus phukhetensis Thach & F. Huber, 2020
 Cyclophorus picturatus (L. Pfeiffer, 1852)
 Cyclophorus plateni Dohrn, 1889
 Cyclophorus pliciferus Martens, 1900
 Cyclophorus poeciloneurus Godwin-Austen & Beddome, 1894
 Cyclophorus polynema (L. Pfeiffer, 1854)
 Cyclophorus polystictus Möllendorff, 1901
 Cyclophorus prietoi Hidalgo, 1888
 Cyclophorus pterocyclus Möllendorff, 1895
 Cyclophorus punctatulus Heude, 1885
 Cyclophorus punctatus (Grateloup, 1840)
 Cyclophorus pyrostoma Möllendorff, 1882
 Cyclophorus pyrotrema Benson, 1854
 Cyclophorus quadrasi Hidalgo, 1888
 Cyclophorus rafflesii (Broderip & G. B. Sowerby I, 1830)
 Cyclophorus raripilus Morelet, 1881
 Cyclophorus reevei Hidalgo, 1888
 Cyclophorus renkeri Thach & F. Huber, 2020
 Cyclophorus saturnus L. Pfeiffer, 1862
 Cyclophorus schepmani Laidlaw, 1957
 Cyclophorus schwabei Thach & F. Huber, 2020
 Cyclophorus scurra Benson, 1857
 Cyclophorus semisulcatus Sowerby, 1843
 Cyclophorus semperi Kobelt, 1886
 Cyclophorus sericatus Ancey, 1888
 Cyclophorus sericinus Quadras & Möllendorff, 1894
 Cyclophorus serratizona Hanley & Theobald, 1876
 Cyclophorus siamensis Sowerby, 1850
 Cyclophorus sidiensis Godwin-Austen, 1915
 Cyclophorus smithi Hidalgo, 1889
 Cyclophorus songmaensis Morlet, 1891
 Cyclophorus sowerbyi Hidalgo, 1888
 Cyclophorus speciosus (Philippi, 1847)
 Cyclophorus spironema (L. Pfeiffer, 1855)
 Cyclophorus sriabbasae Thach, 2020
 Cyclophorus stenomphalus (L. Pfeiffer, 1846)
 Cyclophorus stevenabbasorum Thach, 2016
 Cyclophorus stungtrengensis Thach & F. Huber, 2018
 Cyclophorus subcarinatus Möllendorff, 1882
 Cyclophorus subfloridus Ancey, 1888
 Cyclophorus sublaevigatus W. T. Blanford, 1869
 Cyclophorus sumatrensis (L. Pfeiffer, 1855)
 Cyclophorus szechwanensis Yen, 1939
 Cyclophorus taeniatus (L. Pfeiffer, 1855)
 Cyclophorus takumisaitoi Hirano, 2019
 Cyclophorus talboti Godwin-Austen, 1889
 Cyclophorus telifer Möllendorff, 1889
 Cyclophorus tetrachrous Mabille, 1887
 Cyclophorus thachi F. Huber, 2020
 Cyclophorus thakhekensis Thach & F. Huber, 2018
 Cyclophorus theobaldianus Benson, 1857
 Cyclophorus theodori Ancey, 1888
 Cyclophorus thersites (Shuttleworth, 1852)
 Cyclophorus tigrinus (G. B. Sowerby I, 1842)
 Cyclophorus tornatus Morlet, 1893
 Cyclophorus trochiformis Kobelt, 1886
 Cyclophorus trouiensis Wattebled, 1886
 Cyclophorus tryblium W. H. Benson, 1854
 Cyclophorus turgidus (Pfeiffer, 1851)
 Cyclophorus unicus Mabille, 1887
 Cyclophorus validus (G.B. Sowerby I, 1842)
 Cyclophorus volvulus (O. F. Müller, 1774)
 Cyclophorus woodianus (Lea, 1862)
 Cyclophorus zebra (Grateloup, 1840)
 Cyclophorus zebrinus (Benson, 1836)

Species brought into synonymy
 Cyclophorus atomus Morelet, 1882: synonym of Tornus atomus (Morelet, 1882) (original combination)
 Cyclophorus borneensis Metcalf, 1859 : synonym of Cyclophorus perdix borneensis (Metcalfe, 1851) (unaccepted rank)
 Cyclophorus convexiusculus (L. Pfeiffer, 1855): synonym of Chondrocyclus convexiusculus (L. Pfeiffer, 1855) (superseded combination)
 Cyclophorus cytora Gray, 1850: synonym of Cytora cytora (Gray, 1850)
 Cyclophorus intermedius E. von Martens, 1897: synonym of Maizania elatior (E. von Martens, 1892) (junior synonym)
 Cyclophorus kibonotoensis D'Ailly, 1910: synonym of Maizania hildebrandti kibonotoensis (D'Ailly, 1910) (original combination)
 Cyclophorus leonensis Morelet, 1873: synonym of Maizaniella leonensis (Morelet, 1873) (original combination)
 Cyclophorus lilliputianus Morelet, 1873: synonym of Maizaniella lilliputiana (Morelet, 1873) (original combination)
 Cyclophorus minimus Melvill & Ponsonby, 1898: synonym of Chondrocyclus isipingoensis (Sturany, 1898) (synonym)
 Cyclophorus pinnulifer Benson, 1857: synonym of Scabrina pinnulifer (Benson, 1857) (original combination)
 Cyclophorus preussi E. von Martens, 1892: synonym of Maizaniella preussi (E. von Martens, 1892) (original combination)
 Cyclophorus salleanus E. von Martens, 1865: synonym of Aperostoma mexicanum salleanum (E. von Martens, 1865)
 Cyclophorus underwoodi Da Costa, 1900: synonym of Barbacyclus underwoodi (Da Costa, 1900) (original combination)
 Cyclophorus upolensis Mousson, 1865: synonym of Ostodes upolensis (Mousson, 1865) (original combination)
 Cyclophorus vandellii Nobre, 1886: synonym of Thomeomaizania vandellii (Nobre, 1886) (original combination)
 Cyclophorus volkensi E. von Martens, 1895: synonym of Maizania volkensi (E. von Martens, 1895) (original combination)
 Cyclophorus wahlbergi (Benson, 1852): synonym of Maizania wahlbergi (Benson, 1852) (superseded combination)

References

 Montfort P. (Denys de). (1808-1810). Conchyliologie systématique et classification méthodique des coquilles. Paris: Schoell. Vol. 1: pp. lxxxvii + 409 [1808]. Vol. 2: pp. 676 + 16
 The Raffles Bulletin of Zoology 1995 43(1): 91-113
 Bank, R. (2017). Classification of the Recent terrestrial Gastropoda of the World. Last update: July 16, 2017.

External links 
 http://www.discoverlife.org/mp/20o?search=Cyclophorus
 Montfort P. [Denys de]. (1808-1810). Conchyliologie systématique et classification méthodique des coquilles. Paris: Schoell. Vol. 1: pp. lxxxvii + 409 [1808]. Vol. 2: pp. 676 + 16 [1810 (before 28 May)].

 
Gastropod genera